Afzal ad-Dawlah, Asaf Jah V Mir Tahniyath Ali Khan Siddiqi (11 October 1827 – 26 February 1869) was the ruling Nizam of Hyderabad, India, from 1857 to 1869.

Realm
Asaf Jah V's realm was divided into five subahs and sixteen districts; each subah was headed by a Subedar and each district by a Taluqdar.

Developmental reforms

Hyderabad Medical School
He set up the Hyderabad Medical School (HMS) in 1846 which later came to be known as Osmania Medical College.

Rubath for pilgrims of Hyderabad State

The Nizam's Rubath is an accommodation building purchased by the 5th Nizam for the people of Hyderabad State travelling for their Holy pilgrimage (Hajj) to city of Mecca.

It initially consisted of 42 buildings, but with the expansion of the Grand Mosque, only three buildings remain.

Other reforms
Other reforms during his reign, by his Prime Minister Salar Jung, included the establishment of a governmental central treasury in 1855.

Asaf Jah V reformed the Hyderabad revenue and judicial systems, instituted a postal service and constructed the first rail and telegraph networks. In 1861 he was awarded the Star of India.

During the regime of the Nizam V- Mir Tahniyath Ali Khan Siddiqi (Afzal-ud-Dawlah), Dar-ul-Uloom, the first regular educational institution of Hyderabad, was set up in 1854.

Personal life
Asaf Jah V was the eldest son of Nasir-ud-dawlah, Asaf Jah IV (Mir Farqunda Ali Khan) and his wife Sahebzadi Dilawar unnisa Begum Saheba. 

He was married three times, first to Sahebzadi Mahboob Begum Saheba, second to Sahebzadi Allah Rakhi Begum and third to Sahebzadi Hussaini Begum Saheba, and sired four sons and six daughters.

Death
He died in Hyderabad on 26 February 1869, after a reign of just 12 years and was buried at the Mecca Masjid mosque.

Style and titles
His Highness Sir Nizam-ul-Mulk, Afzal ad-Dawlah, Nawab Farooqi Mir Tahniat Ali Khan Bahadur, Asaf Jah V, GCSI, Nizam of Hyderabad.

See also
Nasir-ud-dawlah, Asaf Jah IV
Mahboob Ali Khan, Asaf Jah VI
Kingdom of Hyderabad

References

External links
 About Afzal-ud-Daulah, Asaf Jah 5
INDIA, HYDERABAD, Afzal ad-Daula (1857-69) Silver rupee of Asaf Jah, Hyderabad, AH 1282

19th-century Indian royalty
19th-century Indian Muslims
Nizams of Hyderabad
Knights Grand Commander of the Order of the Star of India
Indian knights
1827 births
1869 deaths
History of Telangana
Asaf Jahi dynasty